Charles Alexander Gunn or Charles A. Gunn (1870–1945?) was an American architect active in the late 19th and early 20th centuries. He designed Burnham Hospital in Champaign and the University of Illinois Observatory, on campus at the University of Illinois, in Urbana.

Personal life and education
He was born in 1870 in Chicago and graduated from the University of Illinois with a B.S. in architecture in 1892. He was an Assistant in Architecture at the University from 1893–1896. Later he worked in New York 1897–1903 and Pittsburgh 1903–1907.

Career
Gunn became a Presbyterian missionary involved in work to the Philippines, South China and Hawaii. He served as executive secretary of the Layman's Missionary Movement in 1909 and was the Philippines mission architect from 1916–1921. As the Presbyterian representative in the[Missions Architects Bureau, he supervised the construction of the Missions Building located at 169 Yuanmingyuan Road in Shanghai. Finally in 1940 he was as an instructor at the American University of Cairo Egypt before returning to the United States.

References

1870 births
1948 deaths
19th-century American architects
20th-century American architects
University of Illinois alumni
People from Chicago
Architects from Illinois